Miyardan (also Romanized as Mīyārdān) is a village in Mehranrud-e Jonubi Rural District, in the Central District of Bostanabad County, East Azerbaijan Province, Iran. At the 2006 census, its population was 94, in 17 families.

References 

Populated places in Bostanabad County